Pro-independence movements in the Russian Civil War within the territory of the former Russian Empire sought the creation of independent and non-Bolshevik nation states after the October Revolution, therefore being in direct conflict with the Russian Soviet Republic which sought to conquer them. They were often supported politically or militarily by the Entente Powers. Some of them co-operated with the Russian White movement, but others were in conflict with it. Many pro-independence movements emerged after the dissolution of the Russian Empire and fought in the Russian Civil War.

The following list presents some of the pro-independence movements and the conflicts they were involved in during this period.

Western periphery

 (independence from 1917)
 White Guard
 Kingdom of Finland
Finnish Civil War
Heimosodat
Viena expedition
Aunus expedition
 (independence from 1918)
 Estonian Provisional Government
Estonian War of Independence
 (independence from 1918)
 Latvian Provisional Government
Latvian War of Independence
  (independence from 1918)
 Perloja
 Central Lithuania
Lithuanian Wars of Independence
Polish–Lithuanian War
 (independence from 1918)
 Zakopane
 Tarnobrzeg
Polish–Ukrainian War
Polish–Soviet War
Polish–Lithuanian War
 (independence 1917–1921; invaded by the Russian SFSR and then partitioned between Poland, Czechoslovakia, Romania and the Ukrainian SSR)
 Ukrainian State
 West Ukraine
 Komancza
 Hutsul
 Lemko
Ukrainian War of Independence
Ukrainian–Soviet War
Polish–Ukrainian War
 Belarus (independence 1918–1919; invaded by the Russian SFSR and then partitioned between Poland and the Belarusian SSR)
 Crimea (independence 1917–1918; invaded by the Russian SFR, later restored for a short while by the Ukrainian army, invaded and annexed by the Russian SFSR in 1921)
 Crimean Regional Government
 Crimean Frontier Government
 Moldavian Democratic Republic (united with Romania in 1918)

European Russia

East European Russia
 Bashkiria (autonomy and de facto independence 1917–1919; joined the Russian SFSR)
 Idel-Ural (independence 1917–1918; annexed by the Russian SFSR)
North European Russia
 North Ingria
 Committee of Uhtua
 Republic of Uhtua
 Provisional Government of White Karelia
 Provisional Government of Karelia
 Olonets Government of Southern Karelia
 Karelian United Government
 Republic of Eastern Karelia
 Karelian Temporary Committee
 Center Committee Karelian Village of Uhtua
South European Russia
 Kuban Rada (formed into April, 1917. Became the Kuban People's Republic in 1918)
 Kuban People's Republic (independence 1918–1920; annexed by the Russian SFSR)
 (independence 1918–1919; annexed by the Russian SFSR)

Eastern periphery
 Siberian regionalism
 Siberian Republic
 Buryat-Mongolia
 Yakutia
 Green Ukraine
 Chutkotka
 Kamchatkta
 Tungus Republic

Caucasus 

 Transcaucasia
 Azerbaijan (independence 1918–1920; invaded by the Russian SFSR and transformed into the Azerbaijan SSR)
 Republic of Aras
Armenian–Azerbaijani War
Red Army invasion of Azerbaijan
 (independence 1918–1921; invaded by the Russian SFSR and transformed into the Armenian SSR)
 Mountainous Armenia
Georgian–Armenian War
Armenian–Azerbaijani War
Turkish–Armenian War
 Georgia (independence 1918–1921; invaded by the Russian SFSR and transformed into the Georgian SSR)
Georgian–Ossetian conflict
Georgian–Armenian War
Sochi conflict
Red Army invasion of Georgia
 Caucasian Emirate
 Mughan
 Centrocaspian Dictatorship
 United Republics (independence 1917–1922; annexed by the Russian SFSR)

Central Asia
 Basmachi
 Alash Autonomy
 Kazakh Socialist Soviet Republic
 Confederated Republic of Altai
 Karakorum Government
 "second" Confederated Republic of Altai
 Khiva

 Turkestan Autonomy

Formerly
East European Russia
 Provisional Regional Government of the Urals
 Erzya People's Republic
Central Asia
 Semirechye Cossacks

References

Independence movements
Post–Russian Empire states
Russian Civil War
Separatism in Russia